The Architecture and Building Research Institute (ABRI) a leading national research agency in Taiwan under the supervision of the Ministry of the Interior of the Republic of China (Taiwan).

Objectives
 Development of intelligent dwelling spaces
 Promotion of green building and environmental control technology
 Planning for safe housing and disaster prevention
 Establishment of fire safety regulation
 Development of innovative engineering technology
 Vitalization of the building industrial economy
 Establishment of holistic life care building spaces
 Preservation of historical and cultural buildings
 Establishment of building performance certification labels
 Improvement of experiment and testing capability

Transportation
The agency is accessible within walking distance from Dapinglin Station of Taipei Metro.

See also
 Ministry of the Interior (Taiwan)

References

External links

 

1995 establishments in Taiwan
Building research
Executive Yuan
Government agencies established in 1995
Organizations based in New Taipei
Research institutes in Taiwan